Mark Lloyd (born 21 September 1975) is an  English Welterweight boxer.

Lloyd made his professional Boxing debut against Davy Jones which he won in his residence town of Telford. Lloyd has appeared several times on TV's Prizefighter.

Personal life
Lloyd is married and has three children; they live in the town of Telford.

|-
| style="text-align:center;" colspan="8"|15 Win (3 knockout, 12 decision), 7 Losses, 0 Draws
|-  style="text-align:center; background:#e3e3e3;"
|  style="border-style:none none solid solid; "|Res.
|  style="border-style:none none solid solid; "|Opponent
|  style="border-style:none none solid solid; "|Type
|  style="border-style:none none solid solid; "|Rd., Time
|  style="border-style:none none solid solid; "|Date
|  style="border-style:none none solid solid; "|Location
|  style="border-style:none none solid solid; "|Notes
|- align=center
|Win
| Dennis Corpe 
|PTS
|
|2005-09-16
|align=left| Oakengates Theatre, Telford
|Lloyds Pro Debut
|- align=center
|Win
| Gatis Skuja 
|PTS
|
|2005-12-04
|align=left| Oakengates Theatre, Telford
|
|- align=center
|Win
| Davy Jones
|PTS
|
|2006-02-16
|align=left| Dudley Town Hall, England 
| 
|- align=center
|Win
| Ben Hudson
|PTS
|
|2006-04-14
|align=left| Oakengates, Telford, England
|
|- align=center
|Win
| Tommy Jones 
|PTS
|
|2006-05-03
|align=left| Sutton Leisure Complex, Sutton-in-Ashfield, Nottinghamshire, England
|
|- align=center
|Win
| Tommy Jones 
||PTS
| 
|2006-06-29
|align=left| Dudley Town Hall, England 
|
|- align=center
|Win
| Terry Jones 
|TKO
| 
|2006-10-06
|align=left| Dunstall Racetrack, Wolverhampton
|
|- align=center
|Win
| Neil Bonner 
||PTS
| 
|2007-06-28
|align=left| Dudley Town Hall, England
|
|- align=center
|Win
| Volodymyr Borovskyy 
||PTS
|
|2007-09-15
|align=left| International Convention Centre, Birmingham 
|
|- align=center
|Win
| Martin Marshall 
||RTD
|
|2007-12-01
|align=left| Oakengates Theatre, Telford  
|
|- align=center
|Lose 
| Adnan Amar 
||PTS
|
|2008-05-10
|align=left| Nottingham Arena 
|
|- align=center
|Win
| A.A Lowe 
||TKO 
|
|2008-06-20
|align=left| Civic Centre Wolverhampton  
|
|- align=center
|Lose
| Ted Bami 
||UD
|
|2008-10-24
|align=left| York Hall, London
|
|- align=center
|Win
| Steve Conway 
||UD 
|
|2008-10-24
|align=left| York Hall, London
|
|- align=center
|Win
| Jamie Cox 
||TKO
|
|2009-04-24
|align=left| Civic center Wolverhampton 
|
|- align=center
|Win
| Matt Scriven 
||PTS
|
|2010-02-22
|align=left| Birmingham
|
|- align=center
|Win
| Alex Spitko
||PTS
|
|2010-05-24
|align=left| Birmingham
|
|- align=center
|Win 
| Luke Osman 
||PTS
|
|2010-10-04
|align=left| Birmingham
|
|- align=center
|Lose
| Licaino Abis 
||TD
|
|2011-04-15
|align=left| Italy
|
|- align=center
|Lose
| Young Mutley
||SD
|
|2012-02-11
|align=left| Civic Hall Wolverhampton
|
|- align=center
|Lose
| Pier Oliver Cote
||TKO
|
|2012-05-26
|align=left| Nottingham Arena
|
|- align=center
|Lose
| Nasser Al Harbi 
||PTS
|
|2012-10-12
|align=left| Manchester
|
|- align=center

References

External links 
 http://boxrec.com/list_bouts.php?human_id=324365&cat=boxer
 http://www.fightsrec.com/mark-lloyd.html

1975 births
English male boxers
Living people
Welterweight boxers
People from Walsall